The following people have attended and/or graduated from New York University's Tisch School of the Arts.

List

Notes

References 

Lists of people by university or college in New York City

Tisch